Boa, BoA, or BOA may refer to:

Snakes
 Any member of the Boidae, a family of medium to large, non-venomous, constricting snakes
 Any member of the Boinae, a subfamily of boid snakes
 Any member of Boa (genus), a group of boid snakes
 Any member of the Bolyeriidae, a.k.a. Round Island boas, a small family of non-venomous snakes from Mauritius and nearby islands
 Any member of the Tropidophiidae, a.k.a. dwarf boas, a family of non-venomous snakes found in Central America, South
 A common name for Boa constrictor

Organisations
 Bank of America, a large American banking and financial services company
 Bank of Africa, a multinational bank
 Boliviana de Aviación (BoA), a Bolivian state airline
 Boun Oum Airways, a defunct Laotian Airline
 British Octopush Association, which is the controlling body for underwater hockey in the United Kingdom
 British Olympic Association, which oversees Britain's participation in the Olympic Games
 British Optical Association
 British Orthopaedic Association
 Biuro Operacji Antyterrorystycznych (Bureau of Anti-terrorist Operations), the anti-terrorist arm of the Polish state police
 Başbakanlık Osmanlı Arşivleri (The Prime Minister's Ottoman Archives), one of the main Ottoman archives in İstanbul, Turkey

Music
 Bôa, a rock band formed in London in 1993
 Bands of America, an organization that arranges high school marching band competitions
 Black Oak Arkansas, an American rock band
 Bloodstock Open Air, a British hard rock and extreme metal festival
 BoA (album), the eponymous debut English album for South Korean singer BoA
 Boa (album), the eponymous debut album of Croatian band Boa
 Boa (Croatian band), a Croatian and former Yugoslav music group
 Boa (Russian band), a Russian music group in Jazz/Easy-listening/Latino style

Film
New Alcatraz, also known as Boa, a 2001 direct-to-video B-horror film
Boa... Nguu yak!, a 2006 Thai horror film also known as Boa

People with the name Boa 
 BoA (born 1986), South Korean singer
 Boa Sr. (1925–2010), last native speaker of the Aka-Bo language
 Kim Boa (born 1987), South Korean singer, member of the girl group Spica
 Phillip Boa (born 1962), German musician
 Luís Boa Morte, Portuguese footballer whose family name is Boa Morte
 Boa (wrestler), Chinese professional wrestler
 Ryan Boa, Canadian drag queen also known as BOA (Bitch On Arrival)

Other
 Boa (clothing accessory), a type of scarf, typically made of synthetic or real feathers
 Boa (web server), a small-footprint web server
 Boa, Cagdianao, a barangay in the Philippines
 Boa Esporte Clube, a Brazilian football (soccer) club
 Boa Island, in Northern Ireland
 Born-Oppenheimer Approximation, an approximation used in quantum chemistry and molecular physics

See also
 Aboa (disambiguation)

Korean unisex given names